The Mausoleum of Umar Suhrawardi, or the Mosque and the Tomb of the Sheikh Umar Suhrawardi, is a historic complex of a mausoleum and a mosque, located in Baghdad, Iraq. The complex dates back to the Abbasid era and is dedicated to Shahab al-Din Abu Hafs Umar Suhrawardi, the founder of Suhrawardiyya Sufi Order. The mosque is located between the Sheikh Umar Street and Bab al-Wastani of the Baghdad wall, in the southern part of Al-Rusafa.

History 

The construction of the mosque dates back to the 12th century, and the mosque was named after Umar Suhrawardi who was buried in the nearby cemetery. The mosque was renovated by Ismail Pasha in 1902 until 1926. Another renovation was conducted in 1964 by the ministry of endowment. In 2010, it was reported that the minaret is in danger of collapsing.

Construction 

In front of the musholla is the prayer hall, which is part of the mosque. Inside the musholla, there is a door leading to the tomb of Umar Suhrawardi, which is situated opposite a smaller room containing the grave of one of Umar Suhrawardi's students. The tomb chamber is a small room and the grave of Umar Suhrawardi is covered with a wooden zarih. On top of the shrine, there is a unique conical dome built in Seljuq architectural style. Inside the mosque, there is another musholla for summer time surrounding the old cemetery, and a place for five daily prayers which can accommodate up to 400 worshippers. The surrounding cemetery was originally called Al-Wardiyya Cemetery, but it was renamed to Sheikh Umar Cemetery after the burial of Umar Suhrawardi there.

Gallery

See also

 Islam in Iraq
 List of mosques in Iraq

References

12th-century mosques
Mosques in Baghdad
Mausoleums in Iraq
Seljuk architecture